Meltdown is an isometric action-adventure game for the Amstrad CPC published by Alligata in 1986. There are two versions: a 64k version with basic speech synthesis and a 128k version featuring much more speech synthesis. A version was also released in French called Le Syndrome.

Gameplay
The player has to navigate three mazes from the 1st floor down to the 3rd floor of a nuclear reactor to prevent a nuclear meltdown. There are eight computer terminals on each floor, the first allowing access to previous floors. Six of the terminals provide access to a different game within a game which the player must win in order to get a password. Once all six passwords have been retrieved the eighth computer allows the player access to an end-of-level game which the player must complete before being allowed access to the next floor. Altogether there are 24 games (three isometric mazes, 18 sub-games and three end-of-level games) which must be completed to win the whole game. The final game is a text-input only robot system for adjusting the control rods of the reactor so it won't explode.

See also
Scram

References

External links 
 Meltdown at the Amstrad CPC Games Resource

1986 video games
Action-adventure games
Alligata games
Amstrad CPC games
Amstrad CPC-only games
Single-player video games
Video games developed in the United Kingdom
Video games with isometric graphics